Llanrhaiadr railway station was one mile from the village of Llanrhaeadr-yng-Nghinmeirch, Denbighshire, Wales. The station was opened on 1 March 1862 and closed on 2 February 1953. It was demolished in the 1970s and there is no trace of its existence today.

References

Further reading

Disused railway stations in Denbighshire
Railway stations in Great Britain opened in 1862
Railway stations in Great Britain closed in 1953
Former London and North Western Railway stations
1862 establishments in Wales